The Birmingham Theatre School is a drama school, located in Birmingham, England.

The school was founded by Sir Barry Jackson in the theatre that he built, namely the Old Rep Theatre, which was also the first repertory theatre in the world. The school now has over 250 students on a variety of full and part-time. In 1942, Sir Barry Jackson appointed Mary Richards, with whom he had previously worked as an actress, to take over as principal of the drama school. In 1990, Chris Rozanski was appointed principal.

The school has since relocated to The Old Fire Station in Highgate, Birmingham and is no longer based at the Old Rep Theatre.

As well as putting on shows as part of the schools courses the venue, costumes, props and staging is available for hire.

Previous productions

Winners of the Gordon Price Shield for Best All Round Student

Acceptance
Admission into the school is based on an audition and selection process. Successful applicants are notified in writing if they have been accepted into the school.

Alumni
Pal Aron
Nigel Harris
Phil Rose

External links
Official website

Drama schools in Birmingham, West Midlands